Garry Robert Cross (born 7 October 1980) is an English former footballer who played as a right-back and a midfielder.

Career
Cross began his career at Southend United, where he came through the club's youth academy. Cross made 16 Football League appearances during his time at the club, before leaving to join Slough Town in January 2001. Cross' time at Slough only lasted for three months, during which he made 13 appearances in all competitions, scoring once. Following his spell at Slough, Cross signed for hometown club Chelmsford City. During his time at Chelmsford, Cross became a fan favourite. On 24 March 2003, Cross scored the third goal in a 5–0 Essex Senior Cup final win against Aveley. Following four years at Chelmsford, Cross had spells with Thurrock and AFC Hornchurch.

References

1980 births
Living people
Association football defenders
Association football midfielders
English footballers
Sportspeople from Chelmsford
Southend United F.C. players
Slough Town F.C. players
Chelmsford City F.C. players
Thurrock F.C. players
Hornchurch F.C. players
English Football League players